Megacraspedus numidellus is a moth of the family Gelechiidae. It was described by Pierre Chrétien in 1915. It is found in Tunisia.

References

Moths described in 1915
Megacraspedus